The 1982 New Mexico Lobos football team represented the University of New Mexico in the Western Athletic Conference (WAC) during the 1982 NCAA Division I-A football season.  In their third and final season under head coach Joe Morrison, the Lobos compiled a 10–1 record (6–1 against WAC opponents), finished in second place in the WAC, and outscored opponents, 374 to 225.

The team's statistical leaders included Dave Osborn with 1,609 passing yards, Mike D. Carter with 722 rushing yards and 739 receiving yards, and Pete Parks with 60 points scored.

Schedule

References

New Mexico
New Mexico Lobos football seasons
New Mexico Lobos football